John Jardyne Wiggers (August 6, 1917 – March 14, 2007) was an American professional basketball player. He played for the Akron Goodyear Wingfoots in the National Basketball League and averaged 0.6 points per game.

References

1917 births
2007 deaths
Akron Goodyear Wingfoots players
American men's basketball players
Basketball players from New Jersey
Centers (basketball)
Morehead State Eagles men's basketball players
People from Spring Lake, New Jersey
Sportspeople from Monmouth County, New Jersey